The 2008 Vintage Yachting Games was the first post-Olympic multi-class sailing event for discontinued Olympic classes. The event took place on the IJsselmeer of Medemblik, the Netherlands, from 20 September to 27 September 2008.
A total of 66 sailors in 47 boats from 17 countries showed up to compete in six Vintage Yachting Classes

Prologue

Bid process
Since the idea of the Vintage Yachting Games originated from the Netherlands and also the key project team members were living there, it was an easy step to organize this event the first time nearby. So there was no formal bid process. 
The city of Medemblik is since the early 1960s the main capital of the Dutch Olympic sailing community. The IJsselmeer of the coast of Medemblik offers mostly fair conditions for racing. The Royal Yacht Club Hollandia, the primary race organizer in Medemblik, however turned down the request of the Vintage Yachting Games Organization to act as the host club. A perfect alternative was found  in the experienced Surf, Zeil & Watersportvereniging Uitdam and one of its founders Frans Bolweg. With Uitdam the Vintage Yachting Games Organization was ensured form a very professional host club with also many years of experience at the waters near the Medemblik coast. Uitdam co-organized for many years the successful SPA-regatta (currently Holland-regatta or Delta Lloyd Regatta).

Kick-off and preparation
In order to realize the first edition of the Vintage Yachting Games in time and with the proper quality, a project team was put together with competence in areas. Besides the Vintage Yachting Games Organizations board, the project team consisted of Frouk Segaar (Race management), Lydia Verduyn (Fundraising), Peter Hoekstra, Mireille Zeeman and Martijn van der Driest (Ceremonies), Menno Meyer (Jury), Robin Segaar (Measurement) and Frans Bolweg (Host club).

The two main issues of the project team was confronted with were:
 Getting the idea across to the class organizations and sailors
 Fundraising , which turned out to be a very hard task

Both issues were emphasized by the fact that this was the first time ever of such an event. Finally issues were resolved in time by the project team so that the quality of the event was according to the required level.

Costs
The financial strategy of the project team was that it must be able to organize a minimum event with high quality and finance it with the income of the entry fees. Funds and materials from sponsoring would be used to add quality elements to the event so that the sailors would get more value for money and the sponsors had more exposure a shore.

The total cost of the event was approximately €40.000. Because at the last moment there was quite a significant number of no-shows, the project team successfully adjusted the purchase of social events, and some sponsors contributed extra so that the financial aspect of the event stayed (just) in the black.

Vintage

Organization

Venues 

The Regatta Center in Medemblik offers suitable logistic and facilities for the organization of large International sailing events. The waters in front of the Regatta Center are capable for laying out several course areas. For the 2008 Vintage Yachting Games two course areas were used to cater for the Vintage Yachting Classes.

Wind conditions 
The Netherlands in general and the northern part of the IJsselmeer in special has a typical sea climate. The wind is typically gradient driven. In the summer when there is a low tide in the afternoon on the Wadden Sea a sea breeze can develop from the north off the coast of Medemblik.

In September the temperature can vary from 10-30 °C. Occasionally a thunderstorm can develop in the afternoon or evening.

Calendar 
The program of the 2008 Vintage Yachting Games was as follows:

Competition 

 Szabolcs Majthenyi: Multiple World Champion Flying Dutchman
 Gordon Ingate: Olympic participant 1972 in Tempest, long time involved in America's Cup sailing for Australia. Oldest participant during the 2008 Vintage
 Keith Musto: Olympic silver medalist 1964 in Flying Dutchman

Continents 
 Australia
 Europe
 North America
 South America

Countries

Vintage Yachting Classes

Measurement
Measurement during the Vintage Yachting Games was limited to safety equipment of the competing boats. The boats Flying Dutchman and Europe class were weighed and checked. The remaining sails, rigging and boats were just "stamped".
No major measurement issues were found.

Opening ceremony 
The opening ceremony consisted of the following elements:
 Fleet review: During the part the mayor of Medemblik acted as fleet admiral. In that role he judged the execution of the manoeuvers of the fleets of Vintage Yachting classes. The 8 Metre Varg was use as the admirals flagship
 Parade: The sailors walked their flags from the Regatta centre to the medieval castle Radboud.
 Official opening: After the opening speeches and a short video clip of each of the Vintage Yachting Classes in their Olympic days, the mayor declared the Vintage Yachting Games 2008 opened
 Social event: Finally the sailors and organizers enjoyed the dinner in the castle

Closing ceremony
The closing ceremony started with the Vintage InterPares race in the 12’ Dinghies. This was followed by the prize giving. The prizes were handed out by the representatives of the International Class Organizations.
During the closing of the event Rudy den Outer thanked the city of Medemblik for her cooperation. He also announced that “Multilario”, will be the host of the 2012 Vintage Yachting Games. After that the Vintage flag was received from the mayor of Medemblik, Theo van Eijk by the Project manager of the 2012 Edition of the Vintage Yachting Games: Pietro Adamoli. This next edition will be organized at Lake Como.

Media coverage
The official photographer of the 2008 Vintage Yachting Games was Marc van Oers.

The event was covered by the media in several ways:
 National TV 'SBS6' (NED)
 National newspaper 'Telegraaf' (NED)
 Local newspaper 'Noord-Hollands Dagblad'
 The Dutch sailing Magazine 'Zeilen'
 Several International internet sites for yachting
 Web page International Sailing Federation ISAF
 Web pages International Class Organizations (Vintage Classes)
 Europe
 O-Jolle
 Flying Dutchman 
 Soling
 Dragon
 Web pages several national Class organizations (Vintage Olympic Classes)

Sailing 
Races in all events were sailed in a fleet racing format of seven scheduled races. The contestants raced around a course in one group, and each boat earned a score equal conform the bonus point system. The five best scores for each boat were summed up for the overall score. On Saturday 27 September the wind conditions did not allowed a valid race.

Reports per event
Per class separate pages reporting the facts are available (see the details section per class in the medals table).

Report Vintage InterPares race

By crossing colored ribbon Szabolcs Majthenyi, the responsible person of the victorious Hungarian Flying Dutchman, won the Vintage InterPares race 2008. In this race all winners of the Vintage Yachting Games meet each other in a battle between the classes. This race is held in the 12’ Dinghy, an Olympic class in 1920 and 1928. This class is still very active in 10 countries including The Netherlands, Italy and Japan. For privacy reasons the rest of the finishing order will remain a secret. The International Flying Dutchman class was “THE” Vintage Yachting Class till 2012.

Medal summary

Medals

Vintage 2008

Country Trophy

Concerns 
 The major concern for the sailors as well as the organizers and sponsors wat that 19 teams cancelled, for a variety of reasons, less than 48 hours before the opening, or simply did not came. The organization decided that those teams would show in the results.
 Only moments after his arrival at Medemblik, the O-Jolle of Felix Hurter was stolen from the parkinglot of the regatta center. Felix was able to race due to the help of the Dutch O-Jolle class organization and Hendrik van Isselmuiden who lent out his O-Jolle.

References

Information about the Vintage Yachting Classes (former Olympic classes) can be verified by the:
 International Olympic Committee: IOC
 International Sailing Federation: ISAF
 Newport Harbor Nautical Museum: Newport Harbor Nautical Museum
 Nederlands Scheepvaartmuseum Amsterdam : Scheepvaartmuseum
and
 
Information about the organization, conditions, sailors and results can be verified by the:
 Vintage Yachting Games Organization: Vintage Yachting Games
 International Europe Class Union: Europe
 Olympiajolle Class Union: O-Jolle
 International Flying Dutchman Class Organization: Flying Dutchman
 International Soling Association: Soling
 International Dragon Association: Dragon

 
2008
Vintage Yachting Games, 2008